The Guñelve, sometimes known as the Star of Arauco, is a symbol from Mapuche iconography which can be described as an octagram (or a star with eight points) in saltire.

It represents the planet Venus, but has also erroneously been thought to represent the canelo tree, which is considered sacred among the Mapuches.

The guñelve was the inspiration of Bernardo O'Higgins to create the current flag of Chile.

In recent times the guñelve has been used by some designers in Chile, such as during the 2015 Copa América in Chile, when it was used as the symbol of the cup.

See also
Flag of Chile
Flag of the Mapuches

References

Mapuche culture
Star symbols